David Chapman (June 26, 1975 – October 10, 2017) was a number one ranked player in the sport of American handball. He was one of the best handball players ever to play the sport. 

Chapman dominated the four-wall game for 11 years, from 1993 to 2004, winning eight United States Handball Association (USHA) national singles titles and seven national doubles titles in that period. He also won two World singles championships, and two world doubles championships during this part of his career. Throughout this period (1994-2004), Chapman was the number one ranked professional handball player in the world (except for part of 2001). 

Chapman retired in 2004 but returned to the game in 2008 and played until 2012. During this period, he won two more national doubles titles, recaptured his number one ranking in 2010, and in 2011 won his ninth national four-wall singles title at the age of 35. His nine four-wall national singles titles are second only to Naty Alvarado's eleven, and his nine national four-wall doubles titles is number one of all time — achieved with three different doubles partners (Naty Alvarado Jr., Vince Munoz and Emmett Peixoto).

While Chapman's primary focus has been four-wall handball, he also played in several national three-wall tournaments. Before his first retirement, Chapman won two national titles in singles and three in doubles. When he returned to handball he won another national singles title and two more national doubles titles, giving him three national singles and five national doubles titles overall in three-wall handball.

Early life
Chapman started playing when he was three years old by hitting a ball off the garage wall with his father Fred. Chapman is the only player in four-wall history to capture all five USHA national junior titles, accomplished by age sixteen. In 1985, at age ten, Chapman won the eleven-year-old national junior title, the next year, at age eleven, he won the thirteen-year-old title. 

In 1987, at twelve, Chapman lost in the semifinals of the ‘Fifteens’ to fifteen-year-old John Robles, but won the 'Fifteens' the next year at age thirteen. Chapman won the ‘Seventeens’ at age fourteen, but the next year lost in the ‘Nineteens’ to Tati Silverya. Even though the sixteen-year-old Chapman had turned pro, he entered the juniors and won the nineteen-year-old title in December 1991 by beating Tyler Hamel.

In April 1991, at age fifteen, Chapman became the youngest player in professional handball history to qualify for the pro tour. In December 1991, at age sixteen, Chapman became the youngest player to become one of twelve invited players on the pro tour. To do so, Chapman beat fourth-ranked Danny Bell and fifth-ranked Vince Munoz before losing in the semifinal. He then beat the 1989 national champion Poncho Monreal to take third place in the tournament.

In June 1993, at age seventeen, Chapman won his first professional USHA national four-wall title, approximately three years younger than anyone else in the history of the game.

Style of play
The dominant style of play among the pros when Chapman arrived on the scene was a fast-paced, two-handed, serve-and-shoot, power game. Under the older methods, the dominant or strong hand was primarily used for offense (as a sword), and the non-dominant or weak hand was used defensively (as a shield). Tati Silverya, Randy Morones, and Vince Munoz excelled at a totally ambidextrous, sword-and-sword style of play.

Chapman's game frequently was described as a return to traditional "percentage handball," and it also often is described as original or unconventional. Vern Roberts noted: "It’s getting to the point no one doubts Chapman. However, no one understands how he wins." Roberts goes on to offer the insightful analysis of the 16-year-old's style when he first moved into the top 12 pros:

"Wise and wily beyond his years, David forces his opponents to cover every inch of the court. Very sure hands and great anticipation allow him to keep everything but the best shots in play. With a deadly back-wall shot, David preys on any mistake from his opponents who tend to over swing whenever they get a chance to take a full cut at the ball. Back wall kills aren’t his only means of scoring, as he sticks out his hand to stop the ball in the frontcourt and lay down corner kills. It's been said he plays like a Masters-age player. The difference is he is a master at the style."
 
Overall, Chapman's game was organized around his great defense, but backed up by devastating first strike offense. Chapman dictated play by controlling the pace of the game, by keeping his opponents guessing and running. He played most of his shots with his dominant hand while forcing his opponent to play most of their shots with their non-dominant hand.

Chapman vs. Brady rivalry
The rivalry between Dave Chapman and Paul Brady occurred in two different periods. The first period lasted from 2001 through 2004 and the second period from 2009 through 2010. Brady first qualified for the pro tour in October, 2001. 

At that time, Chapman had been the best player in handball for eight years, and Brady was working his way up the rankings. From 2001 to 2004, Chapman played Brady ten times and won nine of them. In 2004, in his eighth attempt, Brady won his first and only match against Chapman, a big money match at the Seattle Showdown. Chapman had beaten Brady a few weeks earlier in the Dallas pro stop, beat him a week after Seattle in another big money match in Anchorage, and beat him in the 2004 USHA national quarterfinals, 21-9, 21-6, where Chapman went on to win his eighth national singles title, and then retired while still the number one ranked player. Brady had moved up to number two.

After nearly four years of retirement, Chapman resumed playing in 2008. By then, Brady was the number one player, had won three consecutive national titles, and would go on to win the next three. This time, Chapman was working his way up the rankings, only to lose to Brady in the finals of the USHA nationals in 2009, 21-6, 21-3 and in 2010, 21-8, 21-9; the only two times they played during Chapman's comeback. Due to injury, Brady didn't play in the nationals in 2011, and Chapman won his ninth USHA national singles title. Chapman retired for the second time early in 2012, and Brady went on to win the nationals in 2012 and 2013. Chapman won nine USHA national singles titles. Brady has won eight, and he is still active.

Coaching
David Chapman ran a large camp in the summer in Colorado and Elite camps in Las Vegas in December every year.

Record in major tournaments
USHA Nationals — Four Wall Singles (Pro division)

USHA Nationals — Four-Wall Doubles

World Championships — Singles

World Championships — Doubles

References

External links
 Dave Chapman Handball

1975 births
2017 deaths
American male handball players
Sportspeople from Missouri